The Home Office travel document is an international travel document issued by the UK Border Agency to an alien resident of United Kingdom who is unable to obtain a national passport.  It is usually valid for five years, or if the holder only has temporary permission to stay in the United Kingdom, the validity will be identical to the length of stay permitted.

Types of documents

 Convention Travel Document - issued to refugees
 Stateless Person’s Document - issued to people who are stateless
 Certificate of Travel - issued to people who cannot obtain a travel document from their country of citizenship
 One-way Travel Document (IS137) - valid for one single journey out of the United Kingdom

Eligibility

The applicant must be a recognised refugee or stateless individual.
The applicant must be a permanent resident of the United Kingdom (e.g. by holding Indefinite Leave to Remain), or have previously been refused asylum but given exceptional leave to enter or remain, discretionary leave to remain or humanitarian protection in the United Kingdom.

Countries which do not recognise the Certificate
The Certificate is not accepted by:
 Qatar
 United Arab Emirates

References

External links
Home Office travel documents

Identity documents of the United Kingdom
International travel documents